Allen Eskens is an American author of mystery, thriller, and suspense novels.

Biography 
Eskens grew up in Missouri and now lives in Minnesota.

Eskens received a Master of Fine Arts degree from Minnesota State University. He also had a degree in journalism from the University of Minnesota and a Juris Doctor degree from Hamline University School of Law.  In addition to official degree programs, he has attended the Iowa Summer Writing Festival and The Loft Literary Center in Minneapolis. 

Aside from writing, Eskens works as a criminal defense attorney.

Awards and honors

Publications

Standalone novels 

 Nothing More Dangerous (2019)

Joe Talpert series 

 The Life We Bury (2014)
 The Shadows We Hide (2018)
 The Stolen Hours (2021)

Detective Max Rupert series 

 The Life We Bury (2014)
 The Guise of Another (2015)
 The Heavens May Fall (2016)
 The Deep Dark Descending (2017)
 The Shadows We Hide (2018)
 Forsaken Country (2022)

References

External links 

 Official website

21st-century American writers
Writers from Minnesota
American mystery writers
American thriller writers